Cathleen McCarron is a Scottish film, television, theatre and audiobook actor and professional voice coach.

Career
Cathleen McCarron has appeared in a number of films, including Made of Honor; and had a recurring part as Molly Anderson in the television series The Bill.

She is particularly know for her audiobook acting, and has been described as "one of Audible's highest-rated narrators". She is widely known for her narration of Gail Honeyman's Eleanor Oliphant is Completely Fine, which is one of the best selling audiobooks of all time. She is included in The Times''' "Isolation Special: The Best Audiobooks" and "31 Unmissable Audiobooks Narrated by Your Favourite Celebrities" in Stylist magazine.

McCarron is known for her clarity, range of accents and ability to portray a range of characters in a single book. As Fionnuala Barrett, senior audio editor at HarperCollins explained in Bookseller Stories Behind the Books of the Year,
The story [of Eleanor Oliphant] is told in the first person by Eleanor. She is tremendously particular when it comes to her use of language, and so I knew we required a reader with great precision to reflect that. At the same time, the narrator had to be versatile to do justice to the wide cast of characters in the story. Cathleen, with her training as an accent and vocal coach, fit the bill perfectly, and with her background as an actor she was able to balance the humour and the darkness of the story beautifully.
McCarron's work on Eleanor Oliphant established her as a narrator who can attract an audience. Barrett comments that "There are definitely [audio narrators] with a following", citing McCarron as an example.

Personal life
McCarron was born in Edinburgh and now lives in Stratford-upon-Avon.

 Awards 
 AudioFile Earphones Award Winner, Contemporary Culture, Surfacing by Kathleen Jamie (2019)
 AudioFile Earphones Award Winner, Mystery & Suspense, Broken Ground, Karen Pirie, Book 5 by Val McDermid (2018)
 Audie Award Winner, Fiction, Eleanor Oliphant is Completely Fine by Gail Honeyman (2018)
 British Book Award Nominee for Best Audiobook, Eleanor Oliphant is Completely Fine by Gail Honeyman (2018)
 AudioFile Earphones Award Winner, Fiction, Eleanor Oliphant is Completely Fine by Gail Honeyman (2017)
 Audible Best of the Year, runner up, Fiction,  Eleanor Oliphant is Completely Fine by Gail Honeyman (2017)
 AudioFile Earphones Award Winner, Mystery & Suspense, Standing Still, Anderson and Costello, Book 8 by Caro Ramsay (2017)

 Narrator work Trumpet by Jackie KayThe Red Road, Alex Morrow, Book 4 by Denise MinaBlood Salt Water, Alex Morrow, Book 5 by Denise MinaEleanor Oliphant is Completely Fine by Gail HoneymanUnder a Pole Star by Stef PenneyStanding Still, Anderson and Costello, Book 8 by Caro RamsayBroken Ground, Karen Pirie, Book 5 by Val McDermidStill Life by Val McDermidConviction by Denise MinaThe Curious Heart of Ailsa Rae by Stephanie ButlandSurfacing by Kathleen JamieWatch Him Die by Craig Robertson

 Film work Made of HonorHidden TV work WitchcrazeThe Bill (recurring role)Doctors''

References 

Audiobook narrators
Scottish film actresses
Year of birth missing (living people)
Living people
Actresses from Edinburgh